Dussault is a French surname. Notable people with the surname include:

Ann Mary Dussault (born 1946), American politician
Bona Dussault (1882–1953), Canadian politician
Dominique Dussault (born 1954), French singer
Jean Dussault (1941–2003), Canadian endocrinologist
Jean Joseph Dussault (1769–1824), French librarian, journalist and literary critic
Joseph-Étienne Dussault (1884–1943), Canadian politician
Louisette Dussault (born 1940), Canadian actor and writer
Marcel Dussault (1926–2014), French cyclist
Nancy Dussault (born 1936), American singer and actress
Norm Dussault (1925–2012), American ice hockey
Rebecca Dussault (born 1980), American cross-country skier
Roland Dussault (born 1940), Canadian politician

See also
Dussault Inc., a Canadian television series

French-language surnames